The Test of Russian as a Foreign Language (TORFL) ( or ) is a contemporary test of Russian language for foreign citizens compliant with the best European quality standards.

Levels 

Levels of the Test of Russian as a Foreign Language are matched to the Common European Framework of Reference for Languages: Learning, Teaching, Assessment (CEFR).

The TORFL test consists of 6 different levels:

 Elementary Level (TEL / A1) — Successful performance at the Test at Elementary Level represents a standard of initial competence in Russian which demonstrates a candidate can satisfy their elementary communicative needs in a limited number of everyday situations. The certificate of Elementary Level proves the competences of candidate for further language learning and achievement of Basic Level of Russian language proficiency.
 Basic Level (TBL / A2) — Successful performance at the Test at Basic Level represents a standard competence in Russian which demonstrates a candidate can satisfy their basic communicative needs in a limited number of situations in everyday and cultural spheres. This level stands for the minimum level required to obtain Russian citizenship. At the same time this level is not sufficient for studying in the Russian educational institutions, except for preparatory faculties (programs or courses) for foreigners.
 The First Certification Level (TORFL-I / B1) — Successful performance at the First Level Certificate indicates an intermediate level of language competence, which demonstrates a candidate can satisfy their main communicative needs in everyday, cultural, educational and professional spheres in line with the State Standard of Competence in Russian as a Foreign Language. In addition, the First Level Certificate allows its holder to apply to a Russian university.
 The Second Level Certificate (TORFL-II / B2) — Successful performance at the Second Level Certificate indicates a high level of competence in Russian which demonstrates a candidate can satisfy their communicative needs in a wide range of situations in cultural, educational and professional spheres. It allows its holder to receive bachelor's, master's and PhD degrees from Russian universities, excluding certain philology-related subjects. This level also allows one to carry out professional activities in the Russian language in the related subject areas: humanitarian sciences (except for philology), engineering, natural sciences, etc.
 The Third Level Certificate (TORFL-III / C1) — Successful performance at the Third Level Certificate indicates that the candidate has a high level of language command in all communicative contexts, which allows them to conduct professional activity in Russian in areas such as Linguistics, Translation, Editing, Journalism, International Relations and Management.
 The Fourth Level Certificate (TORFL-IV / C2) — Successful performance at the Fourth Level Certificate indicates Proficiency in Russian and the candidate's language competence close to a native Russian-speaker. It also enables its holder to receive a Master of Arts degree in philology, undertake all forms of work in Russian philology.

 The Testing Center of the Herzen State Pedagogical University conducts testing in accordance with the Federal Law of the Russian Federation № 115 from the 25th of June 2002.   On the legal status of the foreign citizens in the Russian Federation and the order of the Ministry of Education and Science of the Russian Federation № 1156 from the 28th of August 2014.  On the approval of the form and procedure of the examination in Russian language, history of Russia and fundamentals of legislation of the Russian Federation and requirements on the minimum level of knowledge requisite for the stated exam.

Test Content 

The Test of Russian as a Foreign Language comprises 5 parts examining language competences: writing, vocabulary/grammar, reading, listening and speaking.

Usually the exam is held over a period of 2 days. On the first day candidates take the "Writing", "Vocabulary/Grammar" and “Reading" parts, on the second day – "Listening" and "Speaking" parts. The TORFL test assesses foreign citizens' skills to express various communicative intentions in the writing form using correct words and phrases, to understand different types of written information in Russian, to comprehend information in Russian given aurally, to participate in dialogues and to produce the monologue according to the proposed subject.

The question papers for the TORFL test are compiled by the experts of each educational organization authorized to run the Test, e.g. Herzen University question papers are compiled by Herzen University experts, Moscow State University question papers are compiled by MSU experts and so on.

Procedure of issuing certificates 

After successfully passing a test, a foreign citizen receives the TORFL certificate confirming the person's level of language competence in Russian as a foreign language. The form and procedure of issuing the TORFL certificates are determined by the Order of the Ministry of education and science of the Russian Federation of 25 April 2014 No. 412.

This Order states that the 10 days is the maximum period for issuing a certificate, but the testing organizations seek to do this faster. For example, Herzen University issues a TORFL certificate on the next day after exam.

Testing Centres 

By  the Order of the Ministry of education and science of the Russian Federation of 20 February 2018 No. 130 the list of educational organizations conducting testing of Russian as a foreign language includes 13 educational organizations, for example: Herzen University, Moscow State University, Pskov State University, St. Petersburg State University, RUDN University,  Pushkin State Russian Language Institute.

These Universities are the only organizations authorized to conduct the TORFL test. However, they can outsource the provision of technical support to other organizations in various regions of Russia and in overseas countries. By that SPbU cooperates with more than 50 organizations around the world.

The full lists of test centres where the TORFL test is conducted can be found on the Universities’ websites.

Level comparison with common EFL tests, ALTE and CEFR

References

External links 
 Herzen University;
 Lomonosov Moscow State University;
 Pskov State University;
 Erdal Can Alkoçlar;
 St. Petersburg State University;
 RUDN University;
 Pushkin State Russian Language Institute;
 University of Tyumen;
 Testing Centers Abroad;
 Testing Center in Ukraine;

Russian language tests